Jif, Jiff, JIFF or JIF may refer to:

Brand names
 Cif, a Unilever cleaning product, branded as "Jif" in Australia, New Zealand, Middle East and the Nordic countries
 Jif (lemon juice), a brand of lemon juice sold in the United Kingdom and Ireland by Unilever
 Jif (peanut butter), made by the J.M. Smucker Co.

Festivals
Jaipur International Film Festival, India
Jeonju International Film Festival, Korea

Other uses
Jiffs, British army slang for soldiers of the Indian National Army
Journal impact factor, a metric of an academic journal importance
JPEG Interchange Format, the file format for the JPEG image compression standard

See also
 GIF (disambiguation)
 Jiffy (disambiguation)